Ahmet Li (born January 12, 1991)  is a Chinese-born Turkish table tennis player. He is a member of Beşiktaş J.K. In April 2016, Li climbed up 26 steps to the 40th place in the world ranking list. As of August 2016, he is ranked the forty-fourth player in the world.

In 2012, he took the bronze medal in the under-21 category of the ITTF World Tour Spanish Open in Almeria.

Li won the bronze medal in singles event, and the gold medal in the team event at the 2013 Mediterranean Games in Mersin, Turkey.

He took part at the 2015 European Games in Baku, Azerbaijan. He was eliminated by losing in the first round.

Li earned a quota spot for the 2016 Summer Olympics with his performance at the 2016 ITTF European Olympic Qualification Tournament in Halmstad, Sweden.

References

External links
 

1991 births
Chinese male table tennis players
Chinese emigrants to Turkey
Naturalized citizens of Turkey
Turkish male table tennis players
Table tennis players at the 2015 European Games
European Games competitors for Turkey
Living people
Olympic table tennis players of Turkey
Table tennis players at the 2016 Summer Olympics
Mediterranean Games gold medalists for Turkey
Mediterranean Games bronze medalists for Turkey
Competitors at the 2013 Mediterranean Games
Table tennis players from Anshan
Naturalised table tennis players
Competitors at the 2018 Mediterranean Games
Mediterranean Games medalists in table tennis